Fiftyone Glacier is a large glacier flowing southwards, on the south side of Heard Island in the southern Indian Ocean. Its terminus is located between Lavett Bluff and Lambeth Bluff. To the northeast of Fiftyone Glacier is Winston Glacier, whose terminus is located at Winston Lagoon, between Cape Lockyer and Oatt Rocks.  To the west of Fiftyone Glacier is Deacock Glacier, whose terminus is located between Cape Labuan and Long Beach.

Discovery and naming
Fiftyone Glacier was surveyed by ANARE (Australian National Antarctic Research Expeditions) in 1948. It was named "The 1951 Glacier" by an ANARE party that made a traverse of Heard Island in 1951. The form Fiftyone Glacier was recommended by Antarctic Names Committee of Australia (ANCA) in 1964.

References

Further reading

External links
Click here to see a map of Heard Island and McDonald Islands, including all major topographical features
Australian Antarctic Division
Australian Antarctic Gazetteer
Composite Gazetteer of Antarctica
Australian Antarctic Names and Medals Committee (AANMC)
United States Geological Survey, Geographic Names Information System (GNIS)
Scientific Committee on Antarctic Research (SCAR) 

Glaciers of Heard Island and McDonald Islands